Rosdorf is a municipality in the district of Steinburg, in Schleswig-Holstein, Germany. It is located around 3 kilometres north of Kellinghusen and east of the Stör River. Rosdorf is situated in the Aukrug Nature Park. The federal highway Bundesstraße 206 from Lübeck to Itzehoe is about 4 kilometres south of Rosdorf.

References

Steinburg